There were three Labour Party leadership elections in the United Kingdom in 2015:

2015 Labour Party leadership election (UK) (endorsements)
2015 Labour Party deputy leadership election
2015 Scottish Labour Party leadership election

See also
2015 Australian Labor Party (New South Wales Branch) leadership election
2015 Social Democratic and Labour Party leadership election